George Lodge may refer to:

George C. Lodge (born 1927), American academic and politician
George Cabot Lodge (1873–1909), American poet
George Edward Lodge (1860–1954), British bird artist